Maurice Nikolaevich Yaklashkin (born on August 4, 1947,. village Chuteevo of the Yantikovsky District of the Chuvash ASSR) is a choral, opera and symphony conductor, music teacher, People's Artist of Russia, Honored Art Worker of the Chuvash ASSR, professor. Now he is the artistic director and chief conductor of the Chuvash State Symphony Capella.

Biography 
Maurice Yaklashkin born on August 4, 1947 in the village Chuteevo of the Yantikovsky District of the Chuvash ASSR (RSFSR/USSR). In 1966 he graduated from the music department Kanash pedagogic college school. In 1982 he graduated from the Gorky State Conservatory.

References

External links
 Maurice Yaklashkin in YouTube
 Maurice Yaklashkin in Chuvash encyclopedia
 Тухтăр пулас вырăнне дирижера çаврăннă Яклашкин çитмĕл çул тултарнă
 Минкультуры Чувашии поздравляет дирижера, народного артиста России Мориса Яклашкина с юбилеем

Living people
People's Artists of Russia
Honored Artists of the RSFSR
Soviet classical musicians
Russian classical musicians
Chuvash people
Russian choral conductors
1947 births
21st-century Russian conductors (music)
Russian male conductors (music)
21st-century Russian male musicians